The Missionary Congregation of the Blessed Sacrament (MCBS) is an indigenous clerical congregation of the Syro-Malabar Catholic Church in southern India.

The birth of MCBS 
In the beginning of the twentieth century the Eucharistic-centered re-awakening in the life of the Church, initiated by Pope Pius X (1903–1914), had its impact on the Syro-Malabar Church. There was also a new missionary awareness and enthusiasm in this Apostolic Church. It was in this historical setting that the Missionary Congregation of the Blessed Sacrament (MCBS) was born.
God has been preparing two great men (mahatmas) in the persons of Father Mathew Alakalam and Father Joseph Paredom to take up this new charism in the church, who in fulfilment of their lifelong religious and missionary aspirations outlined a new way of religious life in the Church: the Missionary Congregation of the Blessed Sacrament.
In 1933, the jubilee year of the redemptive sacrifice of our Lord, on Sunday 7 May, the feast of St. Joseph’s patronage, in the mission church at Mallappally, Mar James Kalacherry, bishop of Changanacherry, established the Missionary Congregation of the Blessed Sacrament.
The idea of a new religious community originated in Fr. Mathew Alakalam. His companion, Fr. Joseph Paredom co-operated with him in nurturing it. They, with the blessing and permission of Mar James Kalachery, the late bishop of Changanacherry, had the congregation founded on 7 May 1933 at Mallappally. Before long the residence was shifted to Kaduvakulam, and the Little Flower Ashram there is considered to be the Mother House of the congregation.
The founding Fathers of the congregation have entrusted to its members, as their spiritual heritage, a religious life marked by love and single-minded devotion to the Eucharistic Lord and missionary vitality. Its charism is to live and proclaim the Eucharistic Mystery that is celebrated, to gather the children of God around the altar, to ‘praise God in the midst of His Church, to take part in her sacrifice and to eat the Lord’s supper’ (SC 10) and to uphold the real presence of the Lord in the Blessed Sacrament. The members try to obtain this through their dedicated life and various apostolates.
The congregation has, at present, 412 professed members. There are 37 novices and 172 minor seminarians. It has 90 Houses and Institutions in various dioceses in and outside India.

Growth and development of MCBS 

In 1978, the district of Shimoga in Karnataka, under the jurisdiction of Mananthavady diocese, was entrusted to MCBS for pastoral care and evangelization.

In 1989 the missionary activities of the congregation were extended to Rajasthan. The district of Sirohi is entrusted to the congregation for evangelization.

The ‘Rule of Life’ of the congregation, revised and renewed after a careful study of the charism, nature, spirit, tradition and founders, and according to the directives given by the Congregation for the Oriental Churches, was promulgated on 25 May 1989. The Holy See approved the Rule of Life for an experimental period of seven years and raised the congregation to pontifical Status on 2 December 1989.

In 1992 the districts of Satara and Solapur in Maharashtra, under the jurisdiction of the diocese of Kalyan, were entrusted to the congregation for pastoral care and evangelization.

On 4 May 1995 the congregation was divided into two regions, namely MCBS Emmaus Region and MCBS Zion Region.

Jeevalaya, MCBS’ Major Seminary, was inaugurated on 3 July 1996.

Shencottai Mission in South Tamil Nadu under the jurisdiction of the diocese of Tukala was started in the year 1996 for the pastoral care of the poor and afflicted.

On 2 December 1996 the two regions were raised to the status of provinces, namely, MCBS Emmaus Province and MCBS Zion Province.

On 18 December 1996 Thomas Elavanal, then Superior General, was nominated the first bishop from the Congregation. Mar Thomas Elavanal was consecrated Bishop of Kalyan on 8 February 1997.

On 21 May 1997 the first Provincial synaxis of both provinces was held to elect the Provincial Superiors and their teams.

On 28 October 1998 the Holy See gave definite approbation to the Constitution and Directory of the MCBS.

‘SANATHANA’ MCBS Theologate, Thamarassery was inaugurated on 7 June 2004.

On 7 May 2007, the Platinum Jubilee of the Congregation was inaugurated at Mother House, Kolladu, Kottayam.

On 28 July 2007, Adilabad Mission, the first missionary field in Andhra Pradesh was started in the feast of Blessed Alphonsa

On 29 August, Fr. Joseph Arumachadath, the then Vice Rector of Sanathana MCBS Theologate, Thamarassery was nominated as the first bishop of the Bhadravati Diocese, Karnataka.

2007 September 8 – Missionaries to Switzerland.

On 25 October 2007 – Consecration of Mar Joseph Arumachadath and the inauguration of the Bhadravati Diocese, Karnataka

On 7 May 2008 – Platinum Jubilee celebrations of the Congregation came to its end at MCBS Generalate, Aluva.
On 18 Dec 2009 MCBS missionaries started mission in Tanzania, Africa.

Founders of MCBS

Very Rev Fr Mathew Alakulam MCBS

Childhood 

Fr Mathew Alakulam, the architect of the Missionary Congregation of the Blessed Sacrament (MCBS), was born on 30 March 1888 at Poovathode near Bharananganam. After his primary and high school education he joined the Puthenpally Seminary as a scholastic of Changanassery Archdiocese. On 21 December 1913 he was ordained a priest by Mar Thomas Kurialassery.

Priestly ministry 

Fr Mathew, a zealous young shepherd, served as assistant parish priest at Kurusumkal, Koonammavu, Mundankal, Cheruvandoor, Elamthottam, and Pravithanam and as parish priest at Poovathode, Edamaraku, and Elamthottam. Since 1919 he was professor of Syriac at Puthenpally Seminary. When Mar James Kalassery became Bishop of Changanassery he found none other than Fr Mathew as his first secretary. He was superior of the Franciscan Third Order, and the mastermind behind the Orphanage Press and Priests’ Provident Fund in the diocese of Changanassery.

Foundation Of MCBS 

On 7 May 1933 Fr Mathew Alakulam together with Fr Joseph Paredom founded the Missionary Congregation of the Blessed Sacrament (MCBS) at Mallappally Mission church. Today MCBS, a religious congregation of the pontifical right, is known as the Benedictines of the Syro-Malabar Church due to her unique liturgical, Eucharistic, and missionary charism and contributions.

Loud Speaker Of The Holy Spirit 
Even when Fr Mathew was a young priest he was renowned for his inspiring speeches. His writings and sermons on Holy Spirit were so famous that he came to be known as the ‘Loud Speaker of the Holy Spirit’. Attuned to the voice of the Spirit and walking long distances barefooted, he preached hundreds of retreats in every nook and corner of Kerala.

Literary contributions 

Like St Ephrem Fr Mathew was a powerful instrument in the hands of the Holy Spirit. He was sub-editor of the magazine Eucharist and Priest published from Puthenpally Seminary and was the founding editor of Vedaprachara Madhyasthan, the official tongue of Changanassery Archdiocese. He wrote many articles and authored 24 theological books.

Missionary and mystic of the Eucharist 

Fr Mathew, a great mystic and missionary of the Eucharist, often exclaimed in joy and wonder, "praised be to the Most Holy Mystery of the Eucharist full of goodness and glory. Let there be worship and glory to the Most Blessed Sacrament as innumerable times as there are stars in heaven and clouds in sky". He was called for eternal reward on 21 December 1977 and his mortal remains were buried in the church at the MCBS mother house,Kaduvakkulam.

Rev Fr Joseph Paredom MCBS

Childhood 

Father Joseph Paredom, one of the most brilliant and saintly sons of the Syro-Malabar Church, was born on 15 December 1887 at Mutholapuram in Palai diocese. After high school studies at Puthuvely and Mannanam, on 9 January 1908 he joined the Puthenpally Seminary as a scholastic of the Changanassery Archdiocese. There he found his closest friend and the greatest personality, the Most Holy Eucharist. On 28 December 1914 he was ordained a priest by Mar Thomas Kurialassery.

Shepherd 

Father Joseph, a good shepherd who won hearts of his sheep by his love and gentleness, praiseworthily served at various parishes such as Mutholapuram, Bharananganam, Muttuchira, Thathampally, Kainady, Vadakara, Chemmalamattam, and Marangattupally.

Founder 

The deep desire of Father Paredom to become a religious was consented on 19 April 1933 by Mar James Kalacherry, the Archbishop of Changanacherry. Led by the Holy Spirit, on 7 May 1933 Fr Mathew Alakalam and Father Joseph Paredom founded the Missionary Congregation of the Blessed Sacrament (MCBS).

Superior general 

Trusting fully in the Eucharistic Jesus and heeding always to the whisperings of the Holy Spirit, Father Joseph, the first Superior General of the Missionary Congregation of the Blessed Sacrament, courageously led the congregation during its initial 22 years.

Prophet of the most holy Eucharist 

As John the Apostle at the bosom of Jesus in the Upper Chamber (Jn 13,25), during his old-age Father Joseph spent most of his time before the Blessed Sacrament, thanking, adoring, praising, and glorifying Jesus in the Most Holy Eucharist. Like a branch united to the vine (Jn 15,5) he experienced God’s love and intimacy in a special way in the Holy Eucharist, which is evident from his words, "How lovely to dwell in the presence of the Blessed Sacrament! What there can be more joyful than this! That is what God has given us". Light Lit On The Mountain Father Joseph Paredom, the role model for the Eucharistic Millennium and the Eucharistic Year, received his eternal crown on 21 August 1972. His mortal remains were kept at the MCBS Mother House, Kaduvakulam, Kottayam. Today, like a light lit on the mountain, Father Joseph illumines everyone in the Third Millennium by teaching us, "the goal of apostolic endeavour is that all who are made sons of God by faith and baptism should come together to praise God in the midst of his Church, to take part in the Sacrifice and to eat the Lord’s Supper" (SC 10).

Exhumation and reburial 

The mortal remains of our venerable founders, Fr. Mathew Alakulam and Fr. Joseph Paredam were exhumed from the tombs at Kaduvakulam and reburied temporarily in the tombs prepared in the Lisieux Minor Seminary chapel at Athirampuzha, on 12 May 2009 in the presence of Mar Joseph Perumthottam, the Arch Bishop of Changanacherry.

Charism and nature of MCBS 
In this Congregation our ideal is to consecrate the entire life to the realisation of God’s Kingdom (Matt 6, 10), placing the Eucharist at the core of our being.

Drawing inspiration from the age-old spiritual wisdom of eastern Christian monasticism and from the quest of the sages (rishis) of India for the absolute, the MCBS tries to reach out, in and through the Eucharist, to the God-experience of our father St. Thomas, the Apostle, in his faith-surrender "My Lord and My God" (John20,28).

Our charism, sown by the spirit as a seed in our founders, grew up to the spiritual patrimony of our Congregation. They have entrusted to our keeping for our spiritual heritage, a religious life marked by love and single minded devotion (bhakti) to the Eucharistic Lord and missionary vitality.

This charism is to live and proclaim the Eucharistic Mystery we celebrate, to gather the children of God around the altar to "praise God in the midst of His Church, to take part in the sacrifice and to eat the Lord’s supper" and to uphold the real presence of the Lord in the Blessed Sacrament.

Liturgical Apostolate, Eucharistic Retreat, Parish Apostolate, Proclamation of Good News, Mission towards unity, Inculturation, and Dialogue with other religions and social Apostolate form the core areas of MCBS activity.

Our mission works are mainly among the poor, illiterate, and the marginalized in various parts of India’s vast mission fields entrusted to us for the pastoral care by the local bishops.

Bishops from MCBS

Mar Thomas Elavanal MCBS, Bishop of Kalyan 
On 18 December 1996 Thomas Elavanal, then Superior General, was nominated the first bishop from the Congregation. Mar Thomas Elavanal was consecrated Bishop of Kalyan on 8 February 1997.

Mar Joseph Arumachadath MCBS, Bishop of Bhadravathy 
On 29 August, Fr. Joseph Arumachadath, the then Vice Rector of Sanathana MCBS Theologate, Thamarassery was nominated as the first bishop of the Bhadravati Diocese,Karnataka. On 25 October 2007 – Consecration of Mar Joseph Arumachadath and the inauguration of the Bhadravati Diocese, Karnataka.

References

External links 
 MCBS Apostolate of Documentation and Research
 Missionary Congregation of the Blessed Sacrament
 MCBS EMMAUS PROVINCE
 MCBS ZION PROVINCE
 Lisieux Minor Seminary, Athirampuzha
 Karunikan Group of Publications, India
 Jeevalaya Institute of Philosophy
 Syro Malabar Church

Syro-Malabar Catholic Church
Mcbspariyaram. Com